So This Is Africa is a 1933 American Pre-Code comedy film directed by Edward F. Cline and starring Bert Wheeler, Robert Woolsey, Raquel Torres, and Esther Muir. It was Wheeler and Woolsey's only film for Columbia Pictures.

Plot
Film studio "Ultimate Pictures" plans on producing an animal picture in Africa. The studio gets the help of animal specialist Mrs. Johnson Martini. There's just one problem: she's afraid of animals. Martini and the studio soon learn of Wilbur and Alexander, a couple of down on their luck vaudevillians with a trained lion act. The duo agree to join Martini on an expedition to Africa. While there, the trio finds themselves captured by a tribe of violent Amazons.

Cast
Bert Wheeler as Wilbur
Robert Woolsey as Alexander
Raquel Torres as Tarzana
Esther Muir as Mrs. Johnson Martini
Berton Churchill as President of Ultimate Pictures
Henry Armetta as Street Cleaner
Spencer Charters as Doctor
Spec O'Donnell as Johnny, Office Boy
Jerome Storm as Production Manager

Production
The Motion Picture Division of the Education Board of New York State felt that several lines of dialogue and other sequences in this film were inappropriate. As a result, Columbia Pictures was forced to delete sections of So This Is Africa prior to its release. Norman Krasna requested his name be taken off the credits accordingly.

The character of "Mrs. Johnson Martini" is a play on the real-life celebrity of the era Osa Johnson, generally referred to publicly at that time as Mrs. Martin Johnson.  In collaboration with her husband, Johnson was a well-known documentary filmmaker.  At the time So This Is Africa was issued, Johnson and her husband had just returned from a two-year stint in Africa and had released the documentary film Congorilla.

Availability
To date, So This Is Africa has not been released into the home video market. It is currently owned by Sony Pictures Entertainment. The film has been shown on Turner Classic Movies in the past.

References

External links

Review of film at Variety

1933 films
1933 musical comedy films
1933 romantic comedy films
American musical comedy films
American romantic comedy films
American romantic musical films
American black-and-white films
Columbia Pictures films
Films directed by Edward F. Cline
Films set in Africa
1930s romantic musical films
1930s English-language films
1930s American films